Parapytanga is an extinct monotypic genus of temnospondyl amphibian, the type species being Parapytanga catarinensis. Parapytanga belongs to the family Rhinesuchidae. Fossils have been found in the Middle Permian Rio do Rasto Formation of Brazil.

References

Permian amphibians of South America
Monotypic amphibian genera
Prehistoric vertebrate genera
Taxa named by Sidney H. Haughton
Fossil taxa described in 1925